Thomas Pearson Herriot (11 May 1887 — 20 October 1949) was an English first-class cricketer and physician.

The son of David Herriot, he was born at Berwick-upon-Tweed in May 1887. He was educated in Edinburgh at Fettes College, before matriculating to the University of Edinburgh to study medicine. A club cricketer for Grange, Edinburgh University, and Berwick, Herriot made a single appearance in first-class cricket for Scotland against the touring Indians at Galashiels in 1911. He batted once in the match, with success, scoring 80 runs opening the batting in the Scottish first innings before being dismissed by Jehangir Warden. In the same season, he made a single appearance in minor counties cricket for Northumberland against Norfolk in the Minor Counties Championship at Newcastle-upon-Tyne.

Herriot served in the British Army during the First World War, being commissioned as a temporary lieutenant in Royal Army Medical Corps in February 1915, with promotion to temporary captain following in February 1916. From 1918 to 1919, he served in the Jullundur Brigade in British India, where he made observations about Spanish flu. Herriot relinquished his commission in October 1919, at which point he was made a full captain. He returned to Edinburgh, where he worked as a tuberculosis officer at the Edinburgh City Hospital. Herriot died suddenly at Berwick-upon-Tweed in October 1949.

References

External links
 

1887 births
1949 deaths
People from Berwick-upon-Tweed
Cricketers from Northumberland
People educated at Fettes College
Alumni of the University of Edinburgh
English cricketers
Northumberland cricketers
Scotland cricketers
19th-century Scottish medical doctors
Royal Army Medical Corps officers
British Army personnel of World War I